Theodore Henry Reverman (August 9, 1877 – July 18, 1941) was an American prelate of the Roman Catholic Church who served as the fourth bishop of the Diocese of Superior in Wisconsin from 1926 until his death in 1941.

Biography

Early years and education
Theodore Reverman was born in Louisville, Kentucky, to Theodore and Walburga Louise (née Haming) Reverman or Thomas and Louise Reverman. He attended St. Meinrad's College in St. Meinrad, Indiana for one year (1890–1891) before entering Canisius College in Buffalo, New York, where he earned a Bachelor of Arts degree in 1897. Reverman then studied at the University of Innsbruck in Innsbruck, Austria from 1897 to 1901.

Priesthood
Reverman was ordained to the priesthood by Archbishop Simon Aichner for the Archdiocese of Louisville at Innsbruck on July 26, 1901. He furthered his studies in Rome, where he earned a Doctor of Canon Law degree from the Pontifical Gregorian University in 1903.

Returning to Kentucky, Reverman was appointed as a professor of theology at Preston Park Seminary in Louisville, Kentucky (1903–1905) and as pastor of St. Edward Parish in Jeffersontown, Kentucky (1903–1921). In 1921, he was moved to St. Francis of Assisi Parish in Louisville to serve as pastor until 1926.

Bishop of Superior
On July 2, 1926, Reverman was appointed the fourth bishop of the Diocese of Superior by Pope Pius XI. He received his episcopal consecration on November 30, 1926, from Bishop John A. Floersh, with Bishops Joseph G. Pinten and Henry J. Althoff serving as co-consecrators.Theodore Reverman died at his residence in Superior on July 18, 1941, at age 63.

See also

 Catholic Church hierarchy
 Catholic Church in the United States
 Historical list of the Catholic bishops of the United States
 List of Catholic bishops of the United States
 Lists of patriarchs, archbishops, and bishops

References

External links
Diocese of Superior

1877 births
1941 deaths
20th-century Roman Catholic bishops in the United States
Burials in Wisconsin
Christianity in Louisville, Kentucky
Religious leaders from Louisville, Kentucky
Roman Catholic Archdiocese of Louisville
Roman Catholic bishops of Superior
Catholics from Kentucky